Toujours Moi is a 1999 album by the Belgian singer Axelle Red.

The singles released from this album were "Parce Que C'est Toi", "Bimbo A Moi", "Faire des Mamours", "Ce Matin", "Toujours Moi" and "J'ai Jamais Dit (Que Je Serais Ton Amie)".

Track listing

 "Faire des mamours" (Axelle Red, Christophe Vervoort) – 7:42
 "Mon Futur proche" (Red, Vervoort) – 3:31
 "Ce Matin" (Red, Vervoort) – 2:35
 "Parce que c'est toi" (Red, Daniel Seff) – 4:08
 "À 82 Ans" (Red, D. Seff) – 2:35
 "La Réponse" (Red, Richard Seff) – 4:21
 "Bimbo à moi" (Red, R. Seff) – 3:55
 "Stay or not" (Red, Vervoort) – 8:42
 "J'ai jamais dit (Je serais ton amie)" (Red, D. Seff) – 3:53
 "Quitter tôt" (Red, D. Seff) – 2:56
 "Toujours Moi" (Red, R. Seff) – 5:49

Charts

Certifications

References

1999 albums
Axelle Red albums
Virgin Records albums